Hathor 27 - Coptic Calendar - Hathor 29

The twenty-eighth day of the Coptic month of Hathor, the third month of the Coptic year. On a common year, this day corresponds to November 24, of the Julian Calendar, and December 7, of the Gregorian Calendar. This day falls in the Coptic season of Peret, the season of emergence. This day falls in the Nativity Fast.

Commemorations

Saints 

 The martyrdom of Saint Serapamon the Bishop of Niku

References 

Days of the Coptic calendar